This article contains the discography of American R&B singer Jaheim. This includes studio albums, compilation albums, and singles.

Albums

Studio albums

Compilations

Singles

As a featured guest

References

External links
Official Site
MySpace Official
Jaheim French Fan Page SoulRnB.com

Discographies of American artists